Bryn Eglwys or Bryneglwys (Welsh for Church on the Hill) may refer to:

 Bryn Eglwys quarry, a slate quarry in Gwynedd, Wales
 Bryneglwys, a village in Denbighshire, Wales
 Bryneglwys Fault, a geological fault in Wales
 Bryn Eglwys (locomotive), a former locomotive on the Talyllyn Railway